The Church of Saint Anthony in Casper, Wyoming, is a Roman Catholic church located at 604 S. Center Street. It is a Romanesque Revival building designed by architects Garbutt, Weidner, and Sweeney and built in 1919–20.

It replaced a predecessor wooden church, built following a successful fund-raising drive started in 1897 by several Irish immigrant women.  Irish immigrants worked as shepherds in the area.

The 1920 church is brick and marble upon a concrete foundation, with a full basement and a tile roof.  The brick is laid in stretcher bond.  Its "distinctive square bell tower, tile roof, round arched windows and corbel tables closely resemble churches in Italy and represents the Romanesque Revival architectural style.".

An adjacent rectory, built in 1949-50 is not included in the listing.

Saint Anthony’s Church engages in picketing for the pro life movement in Casper and sponsors True Care, a Crisis pregnancy center and ministry of the church.

References

Roman Catholic churches in Wyoming
National Register of Historic Places in Natrona County, Wyoming
Romanesque Revival architecture in Wyoming
Roman Catholic churches completed in 1920
Churches on the National Register of Historic Places in Wyoming
Anti-abortion movement